Arkadiusz Pyrka (born 20 September 2002) is a Polish professional footballer who plays as a winger for Piast Gliwice.

References

External links
 
 

2002 births
Living people
Association football midfielders
Polish footballers
Poland youth international footballers
Poland under-21 international footballers
Ekstraklasa players
Piast Gliwice players
II liga players
Znicz Pruszków players
People from Radom